A bread trough, dough trough  or kneading trough, sometimes referred to as artesa, is a rectangular receptacle with a shallow basin, and a traditional kneading tool used for the making of dough. The wooden form has been used in Europe for centuries in breadmaking.

Kneading-trough

A kneading trough is a term for the vessel in which dough, after being mixed and leavened was left to swell or ferment.
 
The first citation of kneading-trough in the Oxford English Dictionary is Chaucer, The Miller's Tale, 1386. Flour was not stored, perhaps for fear of insect infestation, but kneaded into dough and baked into the bread without delay. Kneading-troughs in the Miller's Tale are big enough for people to sleep in and may be used as floating rafts.

Other uses
Mechanization in bakeries and new technologies in bread ovens have mostly relegated the artesa to either recycling or as a flowerpot, except in more traditional or rural areas. Some small bakeries continue to use them.

See also 

 Feeding trough, see manger, a food receptacle for animals
 Watering trough, a receptacle of drinking water for animals

References

Breads
History of food and drink
Containers